Jorge "Che" Reyes (14 February 1907 – 29 March 1985) was an Argentine-Mexican actor. He appeared in more than seventy films from 1941 to 1970.

Selected filmography

References

External links 

1907 births
1985 deaths
Mexican male film actors
Argentine emigrants to Mexico